Andorians are a fictional race of humanoid extraterrestrials in the American science fiction franchise Star Trek. They were created by writer D. C. Fontana. Within the Star Trek narrative, they are native to the blue icy Class M moon, Andoria (also called Andor). Distinctive traits of Andorians include their blue/ green skin, a pair of cranial antennae, and white hair.

Andorians first appeared in the 1968 Star Trek: The Original Series episode "Journey to Babel", and have been seen or mentioned in episodes of subsequent series in the Star Trek franchise. They were indicated to be a vital, important member of the United Federation of Planets in the 1997 Star Trek: Deep Space Nine episode "In the Cards", but did not gain considerable exposure until the 2001–2005 series Star Trek: Enterprise, on which they were used as recurring characters, most notably in the person of Thy'lek Shran, a starship commander who maintained a sometimes adversarial and begrudging friendship with Enterprise Captain Jonathan Archer. The series revealed more about Andorian ships, the home world Andoria, and the culture and history of Andorians and their subspecies, the Aenar. The 2004 episode "Zero Hour" established that Andorians were one of the four founding members of the United Federation of Planets.

Development 
Andorians appeared in four episodes of The Original Series, and were background elements in Star Trek: The Motion Picture and Star Trek IV: The Voyage Home, but remained largely undeveloped until Enterprise.  Showrunner Brannon Braga originally wanted to limit the number of original series elements on Enterprise, but came to see the challenge of "tak(ing) the goofiest aliens from The Original Series and make them a real culture that’s cool and believable."

Appearance 

Andorians have blue blood, blue skin, white hair, and antennae on the crown of the skull.  By the time of the 2001 – 2005 TV series Star Trek: Enterprise, the antennae were depicted as protruding from the forehead, and capable of movement, used for gesturing and balancing. The design of Andorians has changed with every new production; including the placement of their antennae, additional makeup appliances, and the blue shade of their skin.

Homeworld 
Andor, also known as Andoria, is an icy moon orbiting a ringed gas giant. In a DVD bonus feature for the 4th season of Enterprise, episode writers Judith and Garfield Reeves-Stevens stated that Andor was the gas giant, Andoria the moon, and that this was a conscious effort to address the discrepancy, but continued varying usage across canon, reference, and licensed sources have not fully resolved the discrepancy.

Most of Andor's cities are built underground to take advantage of geothermal warmth. Temperatures have been known to reach −28 °C in the summer. Andor has at least one moon or neighboring planet. Andorians share their homeworld with an obscure telepathic subspecies, Aenar, which have either light blue or white skin.

The non-canonical Star Trek Star Charts (2002) cites Andor as the seventh planet in orbit around the star Procyon (Alpha Canis Minoris) in the Beta quadrant, but previous material has Andor as the eighth planet of the orange dwarf Epsilon Indi in the Alpha quadrant. Andor is near Betazed, Earth, Tellar, and Vulcan.

Noncanonical information 

A 1970s technical fiction book, The Starfleet Medical Reference Manual, held that Andorians were the only known semi-insectoid race in Federation territory, with a limited exoskeleton and antennae used for both quadriscopic vision reception and focused hearing. These points were repeated in the 1980s book Worlds of the Federation. Fully insectoid races depicted or referred to onscreen include the unseen Jarada in the Next Generation episode "The Big Goodbye", and the Xindi, which were introduced in Star Trek: Enterprises third season.

In the Deep Space Nine relaunch novels, four-person Andorian marriages (briefly mentioned in the Next Generation episode "Data's Day") were extrapolated into four sexes (thaan, chen, shen, and zhen). A recurring plot point in the post-TV series novels is that the rarity of compatible Andorian foursomes produced extremely low reproduction rates which, in tandem with genetic weaknesses, led to the species' near extinction.

Similarly, the Marvel comic book Star Trek: Starfleet Academy refers to complex yet flexible marital structures, involving one or more fathers, and describes Andorians as passionate, with a violent history.

In the Pocket Books continuity, specifically the 2010 novel, Star Trek: Typhon Pact – Paths of Disharmony by Dayton Ward, the Andorian Empire withdraws from the Federation in 2382. However, the Andorian government still maintains diplomatic relations with the Federation, and Andorian officers are allowed to remain in Starfleet if they so choose. Despite Andor's withdrawal, a sizable percentage of the population – represented in the Andorian government by the "New Progressive Party", as opposed to the secessionist "Visionist Party" – favored continuing membership in the Federation, opening the possibility of a later reunification. In a subsequent novel, Dayton Ward's Star Trek: The Fall – Peaceable Kingdoms, Andor does rejoin the Federation.

In the Free-to-play online role-playing game Star Trek Online, which takes place in 2409, the Andorians are still ordinary members of the Federation.

In the Fan film episodic series Starship Exeter, the communications officer on the bridge is an Andorian Lieutenant named B'fuselek.  In this series it is explained that Andorians' antennae give the Andorians the ability to detect nearby fluctuations in gravity, and know their position in relation to these gravity differences. Andorians and Vulcans also have a history of feuding over many things.

Reception 
In 2017, Den of Geek ranked the Andorians the 9th best aliens of the Star Trek franchise, behind the Ferengi.

References

External links

 A Rogues' Gallery of Andorians – a series of blog postings listing the appearances of Andorian characters across all Star Trek media

Star Trek species
Fictional extraterrestrial life forms
Television characters introduced in 1967

cs:Rasy ve Star Treku#Andoriané
de:Völker und Gruppierungen im Star-Trek-Universum#Andorianer